The Federal Rural University of Rio de Janeiro (UFRRJ) is a public university located in Seropédica in the State of Rio de Janeiro, Brazil. It possesses the largest campus among Latin American universities and is known for being the first university to offer agriculture related courses in Brazil.

In the 2019 Folha de São Paulo rankings, UFRRJ was ranked 35th in Brazil, with its programs in veterinary medicine and animal science in the top 10.

History
Founded in October 20, 1910, by then president of the republic Nilo Peçanha, the College of Agriculture and Veterinary Medicine (ESAMV) laid the foundations of agricultural education in Brazil, and began operating in 1913. In 1934, the ESAMV was split into three institutions: the National School of Agriculture, National School of Veterinary Medicine and the National School of Chemistry (incorporated in 1937 by the University of Brazil, later renamed the Federal University of Rio de Janeiro). These institutions have been crucial to overcoming the fragmentary and differentiated knowledge from existing agricultural and veterinary education throughout the nineteenth century and in creating an science-based, academic reference space. In 1944, the schools of agriculture and veterinary medicine were brought together as the Rural University, later renamed the Rural University of Brazil as more programs in rural fields (eg, forestry) were introduced.

The current name dates from 1965, and UFFRJ remains under the federal Ministry of Education.

The university also operates a technical vocational school, offering specialized courses in agriculture, hospitality and the environment, as well as high school courses. Called CTUR, it is located on the main campus in Seropédica.

Smaller campuses are located in Nova Iguaçu and Três Rios.

Noted Scholar Visit
A world-renowned scholar of Negotiation, Conflict Resolution and Peacebuilding Dr. Nancy D. Erbe visited the Federal Rural University of Rio de Janeiro, Brazil twice while she was serving her tenure as Fulbright Distinguished Chair in American Studies ( social inequalities, urban studies, and international relations) in Brazil (2015). During her first visit, she gave a guest lecture on Human Trafficking to students at the Federal Rural University of Rio de Janeiro. The lecture was well received and deeply appreciated by the students (specifically by the girl students) and the faculty. Currently, she is a serving peace studies professor at The California State University (Cal State or CSU), the largest four-year public university system in the United States with 23 campuses.

Undergraduate courses 

 Administration
 Architecture, Urbanism
 Accountancy
 Computer Science
 Information Systems
 Agronomy
 Agricultural and Environmental Engineering
 Engineering Surveying and Cartography
 Forest Engineering
 Food engineering
 Materials engineering
 Chemical Engineering
 Geology
 Mathematics
 Mathematics applied to computer
 Animal Science
 Chemistry
 Agricultural Sciences
 Biological Sciences
 Home Economics
 Pharmacy
 Environmental Management
 Veterinary Medicine
 Psychology
 Economics
 Social sciences
 Social communication, Journalism
 Law
 Art
 Physical education
 Philosophy
 Geography
 History
 Linguistics
 Pedagogy
 International relations
 Tourism
 Hotel Management

References

External links

 

Educational institutions established in 1910
Universities and colleges in Rio de Janeiro (state)
1910 establishments in Brazil
Rio